is a Japanese bank that is headquartered in Aomori, Aomori Prefecture.  The name “Michinoku” is distinctive in that it was the first use of hiragana in the name of a Japanese bank.  Michonoku Bank, while focused on the Tōhoku region, has a network of branches and subsidiary companies that expands beyond the region.  In Japan, Michinoku has offices in Hokkaidō, Akita, Iwate, Miyagi, and Saitama Prefectures, as well as a branch in Tokyo.  Outside Japan, Michinoku has established Michinoku Finance (Hong Kong) Ltd in Hong Kong, established representative offices in Wuhan and Shanghai, China, and has opened three branches throughout Russia in Moscow, Khabarovsk, and Yuzhno-Sakhalinsk, through a subsidiary corporation, The Michonoku Bank (Moscow), though expansion into Russia has met with some controversy.

Profile
As of March 31, 2005

Assets: approximately 1.8 trillion yen (approximately US$16.3 billion)
Employees: 1,212 (excluding subsidiary corporations)
Branches: 111 (87 in Aomori Prefecture, 21 outside of Aomori, 3 in Russia)
President: Yasuo Sugimoto
Member: Regional Banks Association of Japan

History
The current Michinoku Bank can trace its origins to 1894, when the Aomori Shogyo Bank was established.  In 1976, Seiwa Bank, the successor to the Aomori Shogyo Bank, merged with the Hirosaki Sogo Bank to form the current Michinoku Bank.  In January 1980, Michinoku adopted the use of Tom and Jerry as mascots for the bank.  These mascots were used until 2004, when the bank decided to stop using the characters in order to rehabilitate its image as the “Tom and Jerry Bank.”  In 1995, Michinoku opened a representative office in Yuzhno-Sakhalin, and four years later established a subsidiary in Moscow.

Points of interest
Kappei Ina, a local radio talk show host, allegedly claimed that when customers withdrew money at Michinoku automatic teller machines (ATMs), the display did not display the honorific suffix “-sama” that is often used with a company’s customers.  However, the ATMs used this suffix when customers deposited money.  Ina speculated that the reason for this was that those customers that deposited money into the bank were true customers, while those who withdrew money were not customers.  One week after this was aired, the Michinoku ATMs displayed the honorific “-sama” suffix.

Michinoku Bank was the bank that was used in the “Anita Scandal.”  This scandal involved a Japanese businessman for the Aomori Prefectural Public Housing Corporation who was arrested for funneling funds in excess of 13 million US dollars to his Chilean wife, Anita Alvadoro.  Some of this money was used to build a lavish house in Chile.

In April 2005, Michinoku came under fire for losing information over an estimated 1.3 million customers.  This prompted a response from the Japanese Financial Services Agency that Michinoku reform its business practices.  In May, the company’s long serving president, Kosaburo Daidōji, left the company.  Daidōji died on July 21, 2005 at the age of 80.

Russian Business Expansion
One distinctive feature of Michinoku is its expansion into the Russian financial market.  This has been said to be one legacy from former president Kosaburo Daidōji.  Daidōji was said to have developed an interest in Russia after hearing from his father, who had studied in Europe, say that Russians were different from other Europeans in that they did not discriminate against Japanese.

Daidōji had eyed the Russian market since the collapse of the Soviet Union, and finally established the subsidiary on July 7, 1999, becoming the first subsidiary of a Japanese bank to open in Russia.  Following this, Michinoku opened a branch in Yuzhno-Sakhalinsk on August 12, 2002, and then a branch in Khabarovsk on July 7, 2003.  Presently, the Russian operations are said to have a scale of around 10 billion yen and around 7,300 personal accounts, including an account held by Russian pop group t.A.T.u.

There is some controversy behind this move, however.  When Daidōji first initiated the Russian operations, he said that he did not expect to turn profits for 5–10 years.  Industry experts and former employees have criticized this move, claiming that “while the reason for the expansion was that the market in the prefecture was saturated, it was a really risky move,” and “the expansion of business into Russia has come at the expense of the development of the firm.”  While the Russian subsidiary claimed a 240 million yen in pretax profits in December 2004, Michinoku injected 2.1 billion yen of capital into the subsidiary in August of that year.  One former employee said that Michinoku was using capital injections to eliminate the losses by the subsidiary.

References
Corporate data

External links
  Official site
  English part of official site
   Michinoku Bank: Fate of the Specialty Russian Business
   Michinoku Bank Investigation: Legacy of the Daidoji System (part 4) – the Maverick Path

Regional banks of Japan
Government-owned companies of Japan
Companies based in Aomori Prefecture